Meadow is an unincorporated community in Perkins County, South Dakota, United States. Meadow is twelve miles east of Bison and two miles from the junction of South Dakota Highways 20 and 73.  Although not tracked by the Census Bureau, Meadow has been assigned the ZIP code of 57644.  There is a post office located within the town of Meadow.  The surrounding area is farming and ranching land.

Meadow was laid out in 1907, and named for a vast meadow near the original town site.

Meadow is located approximately 15.5 miles to the west from what was the farthest point from any McDonald's restaurant in the contiguous United States in 2009, prior to that point moving . Along with Glad Valley, South Dakota, Meadow is one of the nearest communities to that point.

References

Unincorporated communities in Perkins County, South Dakota
Unincorporated communities in South Dakota